The 1949 Arizona State Sun Devils football team was an American football team that represented Arizona State College (later renamed Arizona State University) in the Border Conference during the 1949 college football season. In their third season under head coach Ed Doherty, the Sun Devils compiled a 7–3 record (4–1 against Border opponents), lost to Xavier in the Salad Bowl, and outscored their opponents by a combined total of 342 to 204.

Schedule

References

Arizona State
Arizona State Sun Devils football seasons
Arizona State Sun Devils football